The 1976 Philadelphia Eagles season was the franchise's 44th in the National Football League (NFL). The Eagles were led by first-year head coach Dick Vermeil. The Eagles matched their 4-10 record from the previous season and failed to reach the playoffs for the 16th consecutive season. It was also the 10th straight season for Philadelphia in which they did not end the season with an above .500 record.

Invincible 

The season was featured in the 2006 film Invincible. The film was about wide receiver and special teamer Vince Papale, portrayed by Mark Wahlberg, who was signed after receiving an invite to training camp after his success with minor league team Philadelphia Bell. The film also feature the hiring of Dick Vermeil, portrayed by Greg Kinnear, and his first training camp with the team. The movie also showed multiple preseason games, as well as the Eagles' road game against the Dallas Cowboys and their first victory of the season over the New York Giants. As is typical with movies based on a true story, several events depicted in the movie, never happened. This includes the Eagles hosting an open tryout where only Papale received a contract offer. Papale's fumble recovery for a touchdown against the Giants did actually happen, however, it was called back due to a penalty.

Offseason 
After coaching 12th ranked UCLA to a win over the number 1 overall ranked Ohio State in the 1976 Rose Bowl 23–10, Vermeil was offered Eagles head coaching job. Due to trades, he did not get a first-round selection in his first draft.

NFL Draft 

The Philadelphia Eagles would pick 9th in the 17 rounds. The Eagles didn’t have a selection in rounds 1, 2, 3, and 12 due to trades.

Roster

Regular season

Schedule 
A game against the St. Louis Cardinals on October 10 was originally scheduled to be played at Veterans Stadium, but was relocated to St. Louis due to a Philadelphia Phillies game for the MLB National League Championship that ended up being played at Veterans Stadium on the same day. The game on November 7 that was originally scheduled to be played in St. Louis was moved to Philadelphia.

Note: Intra-division opponents are in bold text.

Standings

References 

Philadelphia Eagles seasons
Philadelphia Eagles
Philadel